Frédérique Tuffnell (born 29 June 1956) is a French politician who served as a member of the French National Assembly from 2017 to 2022, representing the department of Charente-Maritime. From 2017 until 2020, she was a member of La République En Marche! (LREM). In May 2020, she was one of the 17 initial members of the short-lived Ecology Democracy Solidarity group in the National Assembly.

Political career
In parliament, Tuffnell served on the Committee on Sustainable Development and Spatial Planning. In addition to her committee assignments, she was a member of the French-Indian Parliamentary Friendship Group and the French-Sri Lankan Parliamentary Friendship Group.

In February 2020, Tuffnell left LREM, expressing frustration over the way the government was forcing through its radical reform of the pension system and failing to address environmental issues. In May 2020, she was one of the 17 initial members of the new Ecology Democracy Solidarity group in the National Assembly.

By mid-2021, Tuffnell announced that she would not stand in the 2022 elections but instead resign from active politics by the end of the parliamentary term.

Political positions
In April 2018, Tuffnell joined other co-signatories around Sébastien Nadot in officially filing a request for a commission of inquiry into the legality of French weapons sales to the Saudi-led coalition fighting in Yemen, days before an official visit of Saudi Crown Prince Mohammed bin Salman to Paris.

See also
 2017 French legislative election

References

1956 births
Living people
Deputies of the 15th National Assembly of the French Fifth Republic
La République En Marche! politicians
21st-century French women politicians
Place of birth missing (living people)
Women members of the National Assembly (France)
Ecology Democracy Solidarity politicians
Members of Parliament for Charente-Maritime